Phrynops geoffroanus, commonly known as Geoffroy's side-necked turtle or Geoffroy's toadhead turtle, is a species of large side-necked turtle in the family Chelidae. The species is endemic to South America.

Etymology
The specific name, geoffroanus, is in honor of French naturalist Étienne Geoffroy Saint-Hilaire.

Geographic range
P. geoffroanus is found in southwestern Venezuela, southeastern Colombia, eastern Ecuador, and eastern Peru, southward and eastward through southwestern Brazil and northern Bolivia to Paraguay and northeastern Argentina, then northward through eastern Brazil. It also occurs in eastern Venezuela, and in adjacent Guyana.

References

External links

Phrynops geoffroanus. The Reptile Database.

Further reading
Boulenger GA (1899). Catalogue of the Chelonians, Rhynchocephalians, and Crocodiles in the British Museum (Natural History). New Edition. London: Trustees of the British Museum (Natural History). (Taylor and Francis, printers). x + 311 pp. + Plates I-III. (Hydraspis geoffroyana, pp. 223–224).

Phrynops
Turtles of South America
Reptiles of Bolivia
Reptiles of Brazil
Reptiles of Colombia
Reptiles of Ecuador
Reptiles of French Guiana
Reptiles of Guyana
Reptiles of Paraguay
Reptiles of Peru
Reptiles of Suriname
Reptiles of Venezuela
Taxa named by August Friedrich Schweigger
Reptiles described in 1812